Abu Salma Hammad ibn Salamah ibn Dinar al-Basri (died 167 AH/783 CE), the son of Salamah ibn Dinar, was a prominent narrator of hadith and one of the earliest grammarians of the Arabic language. He was noted to have had a great influence on his student, Sibawayh.

He was a client (mawla) of either Banu Tamim or Quraysh. He was from the generation of the Tabi‘ al-Tabi‘in, one of the early generations of Islam.

Life
In hadith, or recorded statements and actions of the Muslim prophet Muhammad, he was a narrator for later scholars Ibn Jurayj, Sufyan al-Thawri and Abdullah ibn Mubarak. His status was considered by many Muslim scholars to be of the highest rank in regard to biographical evaluation, and he is quoted in both Sahih Muslim and Sahih al-Bukhari, the two most significant collections for Sunni Muslims. He is also considered to have been a teacher of both Abu Dawud at-Tayalisi and Yunus ibn Habib.

References 

783 deaths
Arab grammarians
Tabi‘un hadith narrators
Sunni Muslim scholars of Islam
Medieval grammarians of Arabic
Year of birth unknown